J. Hendrix McLane (born March 23, 1848 in Jackson County, Georgia – died 1893) was an American politician. He ran for governor of South Carolina in the 1882 South Carolina gubernatorial election as a Greenback Labor Party candidate. He belonged to several political parties during his career, and was a reformer for a time in the Republican Party. He advocated for the rights of African Americans. He also campaigned for white agrarian poor of the Southeastern United States. 

Yale University has a collection of his papers.

References

Further reading 
 
 "Bullets, Bourbons, and Benjamins in the Unmaking of Southern Populism," Proteus: A Journal of Ideas 22:1 (spring 2005), 1-8.

South Carolina politicians

1848 births
 1893 deaths
Activists for African-American civil rights